The Haim Synagogue is an Orthodox synagogue in Tehran, Iran. It is located in 30 Tir Street, formerly known as Qavam-os-Saltane, in central Tehran.

In recent years, the synagogue is only opened on the occasions of Shabbat and the High Holy Days, due mainly to emigration and decline in membership.

History 
The Haim Synagogue was built following the Iranian Constitutional Revolution in 1913, under the reign of Ahmad Shah Qajar, by two Iranian Jewish residents Eshagh Sedgh and Eshagh Moradoff. It has often been considered the first urban synagogue in Iran. Prior to its construction, most synagogues in Iran were built in ghettos.

The building was designed by Azizollah Banayan, the only Jewish architect at the time.

World War II 
By the time of World War II, the Haim Synagogue hosted a number of Polish Jewish refugees. After an increase in the number of Polish Jewish refugees, a new Ashkenazi synagogue by the name of Danial Synagogue was built near the Haim Synagogue in 1940.

Operation Ezra and Nehemiah 
In the 1950s, the Haim Synagogue was used as a refugee camp to host a number of Iraqi Jewish refugees, who immigrated to Israel via Iran as part of Operation Ezra and Nehemiah.

Gallery

See also 
List of synagogues in Iran
History of the Jews in Iran

References

Further reading
 

Synagogues in Tehran
Orthodox synagogues
Orthodox Judaism in the Middle East
Buildings and structures in Tehran
Buildings of the Qajar period